is a dam in Niigata Prefecture, Japan.

References

Dams in Niigata Prefecture